Futu Holdings Limited operates as a holding company in digitized brokerage and wealth management platform in China, Hong Kong, the United States, and internationally. The largest investor of Futu as of 2019 is Tencent. Founder Leaf Li is a former employee of Tencent. The company originally traded as NASDAQ symbol FHL, but changed to FUTU.

Futu, raised $90 million in an initial public offering on the Nasdaq on March 8, 2019.

Moomoo 
Moomoo Inc., a subsidiary of Futu, is a U.S.-based financial services company headquartered in Palo Alto, California that allows customers to trade US stocks, Chinese stocks, Hong Kong stocks, ETFs, and options. Moomoo, Inc was founded in March 2018. The platform was created specifically for U.S. customers.

References

Holding companies of Hong Kong
Financial derivative trading companies
Online brokerages
Companies listed on the Nasdaq